The 2007 Women's Good Luck Beijing Hockey Tournament was an invitational international women's field hockey tournament, consisting of a series of test matches. The event, organised by the Chinese Hockey Association, was hosted in Beijing from 8–13 August 2007, and featured four of the top nations in women's field hockey. The tournament served as a test event for the 2008 Summer Olympics.

Australia won the tournament after defeating China 3–1 in penalties after the final finished a 2–2 draw.

Competition format
The tournament featured the national teams of Argentina, Australia, South Africa, and the hosts, China, competing in a round-robin format, with each team playing each other once. Three points will be awarded for a win, one for a draw, and none for a loss.

Results

Pool

Fixtures

Classification matches

Third and fourth place

Final

Statistics

Final standings

Goalscorers

References

2007 in women's field hockey
2007 in Australian women's field hockey
International women's field hockey competitions hosted by China